Caloptilia fraxinella (ash leaf cone roller moth) is a moth of the family Gracillariidae. It is known from Canada (Québec, Alberta, Ontario and Saskatchewan) and the United States (Michigan, Vermont, Ohio, Connecticut, New York and Maine).

It is considered a significant pest of horticultural ash.

The larvae feed on Fraxinus species (including Fraxinus americana, Fraxinus mandshurica, Fraxinus nigra and Fraxinus pennsylvanica) and Ligustrum species. They mine the leaves of their host plant. The larvae form a typical leaf cone. The species is atypical for the genus Caloptilia in that the larva pupates within the leaf cone, in a suspended silken cocoon. The species overwinters as an adult.

External links
Caloptilia at microleps.org
mothphotographersgroup
Bug Guide
Biology of Caloptilia Fraxinella (Lepidoptera: Gracillariidae) on Ornamental Green Ash, Fraxinus Pennsylvanica (Oleaceae)

References

fraxinella
Moths of North America
Moths described in 1915